Gremlis Arvelo (born August 21, 1996) is a Venezuelan table tennis player. She competed at the 2016 Summer Olympics in the women's singles event, in which she was eliminated in the first round by Lily Zhang.

References

1996 births
Living people
Venezuelan female table tennis players
Olympic table tennis players of Venezuela
Table tennis players at the 2016 Summer Olympics
Table tennis players at the 2014 Summer Youth Olympics
South American Games bronze medalists for Venezuela
South American Games medalists in table tennis
Competitors at the 2018 South American Games
Table tennis players at the 2015 Pan American Games
Pan American Games competitors for Venezuela
21st-century Venezuelan women